The 4th Screen Awards also The fourth Annual Screen–Videocon Awards ceremony, presented by Indian Express Group, honored the best Indian Hindi-language films of 1997. The ceremony was held on 17 January 1998 at Andheri Sports Complex, Mumbai. Hosted by Jaaved Jaaferi and co-hosted by Achala Sachdev.

Virasat led the ceremony with 15 nominations, followed by Border with 11 nominations, Pardes with 9 nominations and Dil To Pagal Hai with 8 nominations.

Border won 7 awards, including Best Film and Best Director (for J. P. Dutta), thus becoming the most-awarded film at the ceremony.

Awards 

The winners and nominees have been listed below. Winners are listed first, highlighted in boldface, and indicated with a double dagger.

Jury Awards

Technical Awards

Special awards

Superlatives

References

External links 
 The Screen Awards (1998) at the Internet Movie Database

Screen Awards